Monte Hermoso Básquetbol is a basketball club located in Monte Hermoso, Buenos Aires Province, Argentina.

Honours
 Torneo Nacional de Ascenso (1): 
 2006–07

External links
Official website

Basketball teams in Argentina
Basketball teams established in 1919